Sugar charcoal is formed by the charring of cane sugar, which was repeatedly recrystallized to remove any organic impurities. It is also prepared by the dehydration of sugar in the presence of concentrated sulfuric acid. Since sulfuric acid is a dehydrating agent, it absorbs water from the sugar and leaves behind black residue of carbon. It is the purest form of amorphous carbon.

Use
Since sugar charcoal is a method of producing very pure carbon it is used to prepare artificial diamonds. When heated strongly at high temperature (3000-3500 °C) and high pressure, it is converted into an artificial diamond.

It is used as a reducing agent in the process of extraction of metals.

Sugar charcoal has decolourizing properties, which means it removes some dyes from water like methylene blue.

Charcoal
Sugar production

References